Anwar al-Khatib (1917–1993) was a Palestinian politician based in Jerusalem.

Career
Khatib was born in Hebron, Palestine, towards the end of the Ottoman Caliphate. He was from a prominent land-owning Hebron and East Jerusalemite family whose name "Khatib" stemmed from the deliverance of Islamic sermons by imams during Friday prayer and Eid prayers. He started his political career as a lawyer at the Palestine Higher Islamic Council. He then headed a municipal executive committee between 1949 and 1950, when he was mayor of East Jerusalem, but was replaced to find someone more experienced in Palestinian tribal history. Due to Jordan not formally annexing the West Bank until April 24, 1950, Khatib inherited civil authorities of Palestine, but he subsequently served district commissioner of Old Jerusalem, carrying out administrative duties under the Jordanian government, after being appointed by Abdullah I of Jordan. After the 1967 Israeli invasion, he was banished to Safed on charges of "incitement to subversion" against Israel and were put under police surveillance with orders to report to the police three times a day. He refused to acknowledge the dismissal and found employment as director of the Arab Hotels Company and the Jerusalem Electric Company but attempted to reinstate his old office. He died of a heart attack in East Jerusalem in 1993.

References

1917 births
1993 deaths
Mayors of Jerusalem
Palestinian politicians
People from Jerusalem
People from Hebron